The Idiot (Op.144, 1985), is a Russian-language opera by Mieczysław Weinberg after Fyodor Dostoyevsky's 1869 novel of the same name. The piece was given its world premiere at the National Theatre Mannheim, on 9 May 2013, conducted by Thomas Sanderling, followed by a recording on Pan Classics.

References

1985 operas
The Idiot
Compositions by Mieczysław Weinberg
Russian-language operas
Adaptations of works by Fyodor Dostoyevsky
Operas based on novels
Operas